Patrick Kirwan (1899–1984) was a British screenwriter.

Selected filmography
 Riders to the Sea (1936)
 Wings Over Africa (1936)
 Bulldog Drummond at Bay (1937)
 Farewell Again (1937)
 The Drum (1938)
 The Challenge (1938)
 Queer Cargo (1938)
 The Dark Eyes of London (1939)
 On the Night of the Fire (1939)
 The Arsenal Stadium Mystery (1939)
 Bulldog Sees It Through (1940)
 Convoy (1940)
 Ships with Wings (1941)
 The Day Will Dawn (1942)
 Unpublished Story (1942))
 Dear Octopus (1943)
 Escape to Danger (1943)
 The Captive Heart (1946)
 The Turners of Prospect Road (1947)
 Once Upon a Dream (1949)
 The Chiltern Hundreds (1949)
 The Twenty Questions Murder Mystery (1950)
 A Tale of Five Cities (1951)
 Hotel Sahara (1951)
 Top of the Form (1953)
 Desperate Moment (1953)
 The Fake (1953)
 Up to His Neck (1954)
 Jacqueline (1956)
 Dangerous Exile (1957, additional dialogue)
 Rooney (1958)
 Sally's Irish Rogue (1958)
 Broth of a Boy (1959)
 This Other Eden (1959)
 Tommy the Toreador (1959)
 Johnny Nobody (1961)
 The Hellions (1961)

References

External links

1899 births
1984 deaths
British male screenwriters
Writers from London
20th-century British screenwriters
20th-century English male writers